A Mess in the House is a 1980 Serbian film directed by Ljubiša Ristić.

Sources

External links
 

1980 films
Serbian drama films
1980s Serbian-language films
Yugoslav drama films
Jadran Film films
Films set in Zagreb
Films set in 1942
Yugoslav World War II films